David Lionel Mayhew CBE (born May 1940) is a British banker, chairman of JP Morgan Cazenove until 2011.

Early life
David Lionel Mayhew was born in May 1940. He was educated at Eton, and left with 4 O levels.

Career
Mayhew joined the merchant bank Cazenove as a partner in 1968, and  worked there for more than 40 years. On standing down as chairman of JP Morgan Cazenove in November 2011, the New York Times called him "one of Britain’s most respected bankers". Mayhew subsequently became a vice chairman of global investment banking for JPMorgan Chase. He was appointed CBE in the 2011 Birthday Honours.

Personal life
Mayhew is married to Ginny, a former model, they have three children, and live in Hampshire. He collects art, and is a member of Boodle's and the City of London club. In May 2017, he gave £25,000 to the Conservative Party.

References

1940 births
Living people
People educated at Eton College
British bankers
British chairpersons of corporations
JPMorgan Chase people
Commanders of the Order of the British Empire
Conservative Party (UK) donors